Bitten is a Canadian television series based on Women of the Otherworld, a series of books by author Kelley Armstrong. Its name was taken from the series' first book. It was produced as an original series for Space. The majority of the filming took place in Hespeler, as well as Hamilton and Toronto, Ontario.

On January 11, 2014, the first episode of season one was aired, and the season's last episode was aired on April 5.

On June 30, 2015, the show was renewed for a third season. It was announced December 9, 2015 that the third season would be the series' last.

Series overview

Episodes

Season 1 (2014)

Season 2 (2015)

Season 3 (2016)

Specials

Season 3 Special

InnerSpace: After Bite 
A live after-show titled InnerSpace: After Bite premiered on Space on February 7, 2015, following the season two premiere. After Bite features hosts Ajay Fry, Morgan Hoffman and Teddy Wilson discussing the latest episode with actors and producers of Bitten. It only had one season.

References

External links 
 
 Syfy channel website
 

Lists of Canadian drama television series episodes
Lists of fantasy television series episodes